Momčilo Raičević (born 25 November 1955) is a Serbian football manager and former player.

Playing career
After having played for Vrbas, Raičević moved to Borac Banja Luka in 1980. He spent four seasons with the club, the first of which was in the Yugoslav First League. In 1984, Raičević returned to Vrbas, remaining there until 1988.

Managerial career
Raičević managed numerous clubs in his homeland, including Banat Zrenjanin (December 2008–March 2009), Inđija (October 2009–October 2010), Mačva Šabac (August 2014–March 2015), and OFK Odžaci (February–October 2016).

In February 2022, Raičević was appointed as manager of Obilić Zmajevo.

Honours
Novi Sad
 Serbian League Vojvodina: 2006–07
Inđija
 Serbian First League: 2009–10
Timok
 Serbian League East: 2011–12
OFK Odžaci
 Serbian League Vojvodina: 2015–16

References

External links
 
 

1955 births
Living people
Yugoslav footballers
Serbian footballers
Association football defenders
FK Vrbas players
FK Borac Banja Luka players
Yugoslav First League players
Yugoslav Second League players
Yugoslav football managers
Serbia and Montenegro football managers
Serbian football managers
FK Vrbas managers
FK TSC Bačka Topola managers
FK Hajduk Kula managers
RFK Novi Sad 1921 managers
FK Mladost Apatin managers
FK Banat Zrenjanin managers
FK Inđija managers
FK Timok managers
FK BSK Borča managers
FK Mačva Šabac managers
Serbian SuperLiga managers